Angelino Garzón Quintero (born 29 October 1946) is a Colombian politician who served as Vice President of Colombia, under President Juan Manuel Santos. He was the 69th Governor of Valle del Cauca from 2004 to 2008, and served as the second Minister of Labour and Social Protection under the administration of President Andrés Pastrana Arango. He was Permanent Representative of Colombia to the United Nations Office at Geneva from 29 January 2009 until his resignation in March 2010, in preparation for his election to the Vice Presidency.

Career

He has been a union leader for many labor union and in many positions among these General Secretary of the Central Union of Workers between 1981 and 1990. He later ran for congressman and was elected to become part of the Constituent Assembly of Colombia that created the Colombian Constitution of 1991. He also served as Vice President of the Patriotic Union Party.

During the government of President Andrés Pastrana Arango Garzon was appointed Ministry of Labour and Social Protection from 2000 until 2002. He was one of the ministers of Pastrana's administration with a popular positive image. After serving as minister he was proposed running for president but he declined. Garzon then participated as member of the facilitating Commission for the Humanitarian Accord with the Revolutionary Armed Forces of Colombia guerrilla group (FARC).

He then resigned from the commission to postulate his name for Governor of Valle del Cauca Department. He was elected in 2003 with 60.69% of the votes and winning over Carlos Holmes Trujillo and Carlos José Holguín, this last candidate son of former senator Carlos Holguín Sardi.

During his administration as Governor of Valle del Cauca in 2006, he was criticized for a conflict that surged between a CISA S.A. Constructing Consortium in charge of widening  and repairing the highway Cali–Candelaria but which was never started and CISA S.A.  sued the Valle del Cauca Department. Garzon and his cabinet called for a hunger strike to press for the courts for an outcome favorable for the department.

In June 2007 Garzon accompanied President Álvaro Uribe Vélez as part of the presidential delegation that traveled to Washington, D.C. pursuing the approval by the United States Congress of the Colombia Trade Promotion Agreement between Colombia and the United States. Senador Jorge Enrique Robledo of the Alternative Democratic Pole party and one of the strongest critics of the trade agreement criticized Garzon and mentioned that Garzon had never been part of the Alternative Democratic Pole party nor he had been affiliated to the parties that formed the alliance Independent Democratic Pole or Democratic Alternative.

In 2014, Garzón was offered the post of Ambassador to Brazil, but rejected it on the grounds that his German Shepherd dog would not be able to adapt to the Brazilian climate.

Cancer

Around October 2012, he was diagnosed with prostate cancer.

References

1946 births
Living people
People from Valle del Cauca Department
Colombian trade unionists
Patriotic Union (Colombia) politicians
Colombian Ministers of Labour and Social Protection
Governors of Valle del Cauca Department
Permanent Representatives of Colombia to the United Nations at Geneva
Vice presidents of Colombia
Jorge Tadeo Lozano University alumni